Jackie Young (born September 16, 1997) is an American professional basketball player for the Las Vegas Aces of the Women's National Basketball Association (WNBA). She was drafted first overall by the Las Vegas Aces in the 2019 WNBA draft. A graduate of Princeton Community High School, she played college basketball for the Notre Dame Fighting Irish, reaching two NCAA finals and winning one in 2018. She won a gold medal in Women's 3x3 basketball at the 2020 Summer Olympics and a national professional WNBA championship in 2022.

High school career
In Young's high school career, the PCHS Tigers posted a 97-9 (.915) record. She finished as the leading scorer (girls' or boys' basketball) in Indiana high school history with 3,268 points, eclipsing the 26-year-old record set by Damon Bailey. Overall, Young averaged 30.8 points, 10.3 rebounds, 5.5 assists and 3.5 steals per game, while shooting .583 from the field, .382 from beyond the arc and .858 from the free-throw line. She led Princeton to 53 consecutive wins and the 2015 Indiana Class 3A state championship. She Scored 36 points in state title game, setting the record for most points in a Class 3A final, as well as the most points by one player in any Indiana girls' basketball state title game since 1980.

Young led her team to a 27–1 record in her senior season, ranking third in the state and ninth in the nation in scoring with 34.9 PPG. She also achieved 9.5 rebounds, 5.0 assists and 3.8 steals. She shot .605 as a senior with a .429 mark from three-point range and an .861 free-throw percentage. All told, she compiled 20 30-point games, 10 40-point games and a season high 53 points on Nov. 20 vs. county rival Gibson Southern.

Young set the Indiana high school girls' basketball single season scoring record as a junior, recording 1,003 points. She was the fifth player of either sex in state history to score 1,000 points in a season. She was ranked in the top-10 by nearly all major national recruiting services, including a No. 5 rank by Prospects Nation.

College career
Young played three seasons of college basketball for the Notre Dame Fighting Irish between 2016 and 2019, where she won an NCAA championship as a sophomore in 2018. She earned ACC All-Freshman Team in 2017 and second-team All-ACC in 2019. She also earned ACC tournament MVP in 2019.

Professional career

WNBA
Young had the option to remain at Notre Dame for the 2019–20 college season, but opted to enter the 2019 WNBA draft where she was selected with the first overall pick by the Las Vegas Aces, coached by Bill Laimbeer. She later signed a multi-year deal with Puma. She played the 2019 WNBA season as a point guard for the first time, having played as a shooting guard in college. Young finished eighth in the WNBA with 153 total assists, and her 2.89 assist/turnover ranked sixth overall. She averaged 6.6 points and 3.3 rebounds per game and was subsequently named to the WNBA All-Rookie Team.

In the 2020 WNBA season, Young averaged 10.1 points, 4.0 rebounds and 3.0 assist in 40 games with the Aces.

In the 2021 WNBA season, Young emerged as an early candidate for Most Improved Player after being shifted to that of a play finisher rather than a playmaker but eventually lost out to Brionna Jones as Dallas went out at the semi-final stage of the 2021 WNBA Playoffs Following her further improvements during the 2022 season she was selected as most improved player throughout the WNBA in 2022 She was also announced to her first  WNBA All-Star team as a starter in July. She was also a part of the championship winning Las Vegas Aces.

Turkey and Israel
In February 2020, Young joined Turkish side Elazığ, but her time there lasted only two games due to the coronavirus-induced cancellation of the league.

For the 2020–21 season, Young played in Israel for A.S. Ramat Hasharon.

Australia
On August 3, 2021, Young signed with the Perth Lynx in Australia for the 2021–22 WNBL season. Her performances grew steadily and in particular her scoring improved from an average of 10 points per game in the first ten games to average over twenty five in her subsequent six games including 30, 36 and 26 points in consecutive matches to help Lynx finish the regular season second in the WNBL. Jackie contributed 21, 12 and 18 respectively in the three-match final series which Melbourne Boomers won by two matches to one. Young was made 2021–2 season MVP for Perth Lynx and was runner-up overall league MVP.

National team career
In July 2021, Young won a gold medal in Women's 3x3 basketball at the 2020 Summer Olympics.

Career statistics

College

|-
| style="text-align:left;"| 2016–17
| style="text-align:left;"| Notre Dame
| 33 || 0 || 21.4 || .463 || .379 || .803 || 4.6 || 1.4 || 1.8 || 0.3 || 1.5 || 7.3
|-
| style="text-align:left;"| 2017–18
| style="text-align:left;"| Notre Dame
| 38 || 38 || 34.4 || .520 || .282 || .789 || 6.6 || 3.7 || 1.4 || 0.5 || 2.4 || 14.5
|-
| style="text-align:left;"| 2018–19
| style="text-align:left;"| Notre Dame
| 38 || 37 || 32.2 || .528 || .452 || .785 || 7.4 || 5.1 || 1.3 || 0.4 || 1.9 || 14.7
|- class="sortbottom"
| style="text-align:center;" colspan="2"| Career
| 109 || 75 || 29.7 || .512 || .364 || .790 || 6.3 || 3.5 || 1.2 || 0.4 || 1.9 || 12.4

WNBA

Regular season

|-
| style="text-align:left;"| 2019
| style="text-align:left;"| Las Vegas
| 34 || 34 || 22.6 || .322 || .318 || .808 || 3.3 || 4.5 || 0.8 || 0.4 || 1.6 || 6.6
|-
| style="text-align:left;"| 2020
| style="text-align:left;"| Las Vegas
| 22 || 0 || 25.8 || .492 || .231 || .852 || 4.3 || 3.0 || 0.7 || 0.1 || 1.6 || 11.0
|-
| style="text-align:left;"| 2021
| style="text-align:left;"| Las Vegas
| 32 || 32 || 31.8 || .507 || .250 || .833 || 4.1 || 3.2 || 1.1 || 0.3 || 1.5 || 12.2
|-
|style="text-align:left;background:#afe6ba;"| 2022†
| style="text-align:left;"| Las Vegas
| 34 || 34 || 33.2 || .476 || .431 || .859 || 4.4 || 3.9 || 1.4 || 0.2 || 1.3 || 15.9
|- 
| style="text-align:left;"| Career
| style="text-align:left;"| 4 years, 1 team
| 122 || 100 || 28.5 || .455 || .373 || .841 || 4.0 || 3.7 || 1.0 || 0.3 || 1.5 || 11.5

Postseason

|-
| style="text-align:left;"| 2019
| style="text-align:left;"| Las Vegas
| 5 || 5 || 12.4 || .409 || .800 || .875 || 1.8 || 2.6 || 0.0 || 0.0 || 1.2 || 5.8
|-
| style="text-align:left;"| 2020
| style="text-align:left;"| Las Vegas
| 8 || 0 || 20.4 || .309 || .167 || .905 || 3.0 || 2.8 || 0.3 || 0.1 || 2.4 || 7.8
|-
| style="text-align:left;"| 2021
| style="text-align:left;"| Las Vegas
| 5 || 5 || 26.0 || .333 || .000 || 1.000 || 3.2 || 2.2 || 1.0 || 0.4 || 0.6 || 5.6
|-
|style="text-align:left;background:#afe6ba;"| 2022†
| style="text-align:left;"| Las Vegas
| 10 || 10 || 34.5 || .432 || .474 || .926 || 4.1 || 3.0 || 0.8 || 0.1 || 1.6 || 12.5
|- 
| style="text-align:left;"| Career
| style="text-align:left;"| 4 years, 1 team
| 28 || 20 || 25.0 || .376 || .460 || .919 || 3.2 || 2.7 || 0.5 || 0.1 || 1.6 || 8.7

FIBA

{| class="wikitable"
|+ Figures are average per game
| style="text-align:left;"| Year/League
| style="text-align:left;"| Team
| G || MIN || PTS || 2FGP || 3FGP || FT || RO || RD || RT || AS || PF || BS || ST || TO || RNK
|-
| style="text-align:left;"| Turkish League 2020
| style="text-align:left;"| Elazig
| 2 || 20.5 || 4.5 || 28.6% || 0.0%|| 50.0% || 1.5 || 2.0 || 3.5 || 2.5 || 2.0  || 0.0 || 2.0 || 3.0 || 1.0
|-

WNBL (Australia)

References

External links
Notre Dame Fighting Irish bio

Las Vegas aces

1997 births
Living people
3x3 basketball players at the 2020 Summer Olympics
All-American college women's basketball players
American expatriate basketball people in Australia
American women's 3x3 basketball players
American women's basketball players
Basketball players from Indiana
Las Vegas Aces draft picks
Las Vegas Aces players
McDonald's High School All-Americans
Medalists at the 2020 Summer Olympics
Notre Dame Fighting Irish women's basketball players
Olympic 3x3 basketball players of the United States
Olympic gold medalists for the United States in 3x3 basketball
People from Princeton, Indiana
Perth Lynx players
Shooting guards
Women's National Basketball Association All-Stars
Women's National Basketball Association first-overall draft picks